Bothriaster primigenius is a species of sea stars in the family Orestieridae. It is the sole species in the genus Bothriaster.

It is suspected to be only the juvenile stage of some large Oreasteridae such as Choriaster granulatus.

References

Oreasteridae
Monotypic echinoderm genera
Asteroidea genera
Taxa named by Ludwig Heinrich Philipp Döderlein